Not for Publication is an American crime drama TV series which aired on the now-defunct DuMont Television Network from April 1951 to May 1952.

Broadcast history
The show aired for 15 minutes from April 27, 1951, to August 27, 1951, and then brought back as a 30-minute show on December 21, 1951. The final show aired on May 27, 1952. The series focuses on Collins, a reporter at the fictional New York Ledger. William Adler played Collins in the 15-minute version and Jerome Cowan played Collins in the 30-minute version. Jon Silo portrayed Luchek.

Cowan said that he felt "right at home" in "giving a true-to-life picture" of reporters in contrast to other depictions that had reporters solving crimes that baffled police.

Critical reception
A review of the May 8, 1958, episode in the trade publication The Billboard complimented several aspects of the episode. Leon Morse described Not for Publication as "a property of considerable promise" — one with "a natural human interest slant which should be productive of a televiewing audience". The review described the direction and camera work as "outstanding" and praised the performances of Henry Barnard and Sally Gracie in their roles. The only negative aspect mentioned was the sound heard during a telephone conversation.

Production 
Roger Gerry was the producer, and Dick Sandwick was the director. The first version of the program was broadcast from 7:45 to 8 p.m. Eastern Time on Mondays and Thursdays. The second version initially ran from 8:30 to 9 p.m. ET on Fridays. In March 1952, it moved to 10-10:30 p.m. ET on Tuesdays.

Episode status
Twelve episodes are in the collection of the UCLA Film and Television Archive.

See also
List of programs broadcast by the DuMont Television Network
List of surviving DuMont Television Network broadcasts

References

Bibliography
David Weinstein, The Forgotten Network: DuMont and the Birth of American Television (Philadelphia: Temple University Press, 2004)

External links
 
DuMont historical website
List of episodes at CTVA

1951 American television series debuts
1952 American television series endings
1950s American drama television series
Black-and-white American television shows
DuMont Television Network original programming
English-language television shows